The 1990–91 Primeira Divisão was the 57th edition of top flight of Portuguese football. It started on 19 August 1990 with a match between Farense and Nacional, and ended on 26 May 1991. The league was contested by 20 clubs with Porto  as the defending champions.

Benfica qualified for the 1991–92 European Cup first round, Porto qualified for the 1991–92 European Cup Winners' Cup first round, and Sporting CP, Boavista  and Salgueiros qualified for the 1991–92 UEFA Cup first round; in opposite, Tirsense, Vitória de Setúbal, Estrela da Amadora, Belenenses and Nacional were relegated to the Liga de Honra. Rui Águas was the top scorer with 25 goals.

Promotion and relegation

Teams relegated to Liga de Honra
Portimonense
Feirense

Portimonense and Feirense were consigned to the Liga de Honra following their final classification in 1989-90 season.

Teams promoted from Liga de Honra
Salgueiros
Gil Vicente
Farense
Famalicão

The other two teams were replaced by Salgueiros, Gil Vicente, Farense and Famalicão from the Liga de Honra, as the league increase from 18 to 20 teams.

Teams

Stadia and locations

Managerial changes

League table

Results

Top goalscorers

Source: Foradejogo

References

External links
 Portugal 1990-91 - RSSSF (Jorge Miguel Teixeira)
 Portuguese League 1990/91 - footballzz.co.uk
 Portugal - Table of Honor - Soccer Library 

Primeira Liga seasons
Port
1990–91 in Portuguese football